The Islamic Revolutionary Guard Corps Aerospace Force or Islamic Revolutionary Guard Corps Air and Space Force (IRGCASF; , officially acronymed NEHSA) is the strategic missile, air, and space force within the Islamic Revolutionary Guard Corps (IRGC) of Iran. It was renamed from the IRGC Air Force into the IRGC Aerospace Force in 2009.

Aviation forces

Most American public sources disagree and argue on which aircraft are operated by the AFAGIR.
The Washington Institute for Near East Policy said in 2005 that "[t]he backbone of the IRGCAF consists of ten Su-25 Frogfoot attack aircraft (including seven flown from Iraq to Iran during the 1991 Gulf War, kept airworthy with the help of Georgian technicians) and around forty EMB-312 Tucanos". The Washington Institute also said that the IRGCAF maintained thirty Y-12 and Dassault Falcon 20 light transports, as well as MFI-17 Mushshak and Super Mushshak trainers and locally built Ababil and Mohajer reconnaissance unmanned aerial vehicles (UAVs).

The AFAGIR also operates a sizable rotary-wing force consisting of around twenty Mi-171 helicopters for transport and armed assault roles, and a large transport force out of Shiraz, equipped with around fifteen ex-Iraqi Il-76s (originally operated by the IRIAF) and twelve An-74TK-200 transports. Scramble backs up this picture in general, reporting An-74s, An-14s, and Su-25Ks at Tehran Mehrabad, Chengdu F-7Ms at Zahedan (while saying that MFI-17s were often reported at Zahedan incorrectly), and Il-76 AEW variants at Shiraz Shahid Dastghaib International Airport, while saying that they might be based at Mehrabad. Scramble also said that an unknown number of "new" Su-25s were delivered in 2003.

However, other, later writings make no mention of Su-25s or Il-76s. Anthony Cordesman of the Center for Strategic and International Studies, writing in August 2007, said only the AFAGIR "may operate Iran's 10 EMB-312 Tucanos", and that it "seems to operate many of Iran's 45 PC-7 training aircraft" as well as Pakistani-built training aircraft at a school near Mushshak, "but this school may be run by the regular air force". He also specifically said that reports of the Revolutionary Guards operating F-7s did not seem to be correct.

Cordesman also noted claims of the AFAGIR building gliders for use in unconventional warfare, saying that they would be unsuitable delivery platforms, but could at least carry a small number of weapons. However the attached reference was a 1996 Reuters report, making the sources for such assertions extremely thin. Finally, the IISS Military Balance 2007 makes no mention of aircraft at all, referring only to the Shahab 1, 2, and 3 missiles.

In October 2009 it was announced that its name has been changed from IRGC Air Force to IRGC Aerospace Force.

In February 2014 Jane's announced that the Barani missile system had been tested. This system is a laser-guided air-to-surface missile which releases submunitions: "new generation of long-range ballistic missiles carrying multiple re-entry vehicle MIRV payloads". The UN Panel of Experts identified it as a variant of the Shahab (Ghadr 1) and questioned its alleged multiple re-
entry  vehicle  capability,  suggesting  instead  that  it  carried  sub-munitions.

The Bina missile, which can be carried aloft and is able to be ground-launched from a rail car, was also revealed at the time.

Current aircraft inventory

Aircraft on loan 
The Aerospace Force owns some civilian aircraft. As of 2017, six Russian-made transport planes were reportedly leased to Pouya Air, and two more Embraer ERJ-145ER jets acquired.

Missile forces

The IRGC Aerospace Force is responsible for the operation of Iran's surface-to-surface (SSM) missile systems. In August 2013, Ahmad Vahidi. former defense minister of Iran said that his country is ranked sixth in the world in missile production. It is claimed to operate several thousand short- and medium-range mobile ballistic missiles, including the Shahab-3/3B with a range of up to 2,100 kilometers, which is the mainstay of Iran's strategic deterrent. This puts even NATO members Turkey, Greece, Bulgaria and Romania within striking range, if fired from Western Iran. If Iran ever produces nuclear weapons, they fall under the direct supervision of the Aerospace Force. Iran says that it has no intention of producing nuclear weapons.

Despite earlier roots, the Iranian military industry started the missile development program in earnest during Iran's long and costly war with Iraq. At times, throughout the war Iran found that it could not strike certain Iraqi facilities or targets with its own forces. This resulted in an ambitious missile development programme that is still continuing. Today, Iran is developing space launch vehicles and sophisticated medium-range ballistic missiles. Iran's ballistic missiles possess the capability to deliver a variety of conventional high explosive and submunition, as well as MIRVs. Iran's achievements in missile development have been called "impressive" by IISS.

In May 2013 Iran's Ministry of Defense and Logistics delivered a massive number of missile TELs to IRGC AF, “Iranian television footage showed at least 26 TELs lined up in two rows for the event, which marked their purported delivery to the Islamic Revolution Guards Corps (IRGC) Aerospace Force, which operates the country's ballistic missiles”, according to the report by IHS Jane's.

It  would  probably  require  nuclear warheads  in order  to  compensate  for  critical  problems  in  accuracy,  reliability,  and  warhead lethality.

On 20 June 2020 Iranian admiral Hossein Khanzadi said that the country would start producing indigenous Supersonic cruise missiles equipped with turbofan engines soon.

Short range missiles

Solid fuel program
The foundations for this were laid with the Oghab and Shahin-II missiles. These would lead the way for a number of other rocket artillery systems including Fajr, Nazeat, and Zelzal. The initial effort in this area relied heavily on technical help from the People's Republic of China in the form of assembly and manufacturing contracts during 1991 and 1992. Iran was quick to surpass the Chinese level of assistance and became self-sufficient.

Bina

Bina is a laser guided dual-capability short-range surface-to-surface and air-to-surface missile.  It appears to be an AGM-65 Maverick air-to-ground missile with a semi-active laser (SAL) seeker fitted to its nose. Brigadier General Hossein Dehqan said the ballistic missile had radar-evading capabilities.  "The new generation of long-range ground-to-ground ballistic missile with a fragmentation warhead and the laser-guided air-to-surface and surface-to-surface missile dubbed Bina (Insightful) have been successfully test-fired. The Bina missile is capable of striking important targets such as bridges, tanks and enemy command centres with great precision."

Liquid fuel program
After the war, Iran's experience of liquid fuel missiles had purely focused on the reverse engineering of Scud-B missiles. However, with the post war reorganisation the focus of the effort quickly changed and focused on assembly and maintenance. A domestic version of the Scud-B, known as Shahab-1, was developed and manufactured. This led to its successor the Shahab-2, a variant of the Scud-C with a range of 500 to 700 km, and finally the Shahab-3.

Since the end of the war, Iran has consistently attempted to recruit foreign help, as well as its large and highly qualified expatriate population, into its missile program. Iranian expatriates who left with the revolution have been slow to return, but many are now doing so and thus heralding a new age for Iran's missile development programme with their tremendous wealth of technical experience.

Other missile systems

Iran has an arsenal of short-range, liquid-fueled missiles including the Scud-B and Scud-C, and is now able to produce SCUD type missiles on its own, such as the R-17E, a variant of the Russian R-17 Elbrus (Scud-B). The Aerospace Industries Organization, a subsidiary of Iran's Ministry of Defense, supports the manufacturing process by engaging in SCUD missile restoration. Its short-range missile inventory also includes solid-fueled missiles, such as the Tondar-69 and the Fateh-110.

Also, Iranian artillery rockets include the Samid, the Shahin-2, the Naze'at, and the Zelzal family (Zelzal-1, Zelzal-2, and Zelzal-3).

Longer range ballistic missiles (>1,000 km)
, Iran has an active interest in developing, acquiring, and deploying a broad range of ballistic missiles, as well as developing a space launch capability. In mid-July 2008, Iran launched a number of ballistic missiles during military exercises, reportedly including the medium-range Shahab-3. Iran announced other missile and space launch tests in August and November 2008. In February 2009, Iran announced it launched a satellite into orbit and "officially achieved a presence in space."

Fajr-3 MIRV

The Fajr-3 is currently Iran's most advanced ballistic missile. It is a domestically developed liquid fuel missile with an unknown range. What makes it Iran's most advanced rocket is that the Iranian government says it has multiple independently targeted reentry vehicles (MIRV) capabilities. Its MIRV capability may give it the ability of avoiding anti-missile surface-to-air missiles (SAMs). The missile was last launched during Holy Prophet wargames, which was the IRGC's largest naval war games ever. The Fajr-3 and the Fajr-3 artillery rocket are different systems.

Shahab-3

Shahab-3 is a medium-range ballistic missile (MRBM) that was built by Iran's military. Making this missile was a major step in Iran's missile industry, and it opened the way to longer-range missiles. Shahab-3D, which followed the Shahab-3C, is Iran's latest Shahab model. A  range including Russia (as far as Moscow), Ukraine, parts of Hungary, Serbia, Greece, Egypt, Arabia, parts of India and China, as well as countries closer to Iran.

Jane's Information Group said in 2006 that Iran had six operational Shahab-3 brigades, the first of which was established in July 2003. Anthony Cordesman at the Center for Strategic and International Studies however said only in August 2007 that 'the air force of the IRGC is believed to operate Iran's three Shahab-3 intermediate-range ballistic missiles units' while noting that their actual operational status remains uncertain.

Ghadr-110

The Ghadr-110 is a medium-range ballistic missile designed and developed by Iran.

It is believed to be an improved version of the Shahab-3, also known as the Ghadr-101. It has a liquid-fuel first stage and a solid-fuel second stage, which allows it to have a range of 2,000 km. It has a higher maneuverability than the Shahab-3 and a setup time of 30 minutes which is shorter than that of the Shahab-3.

Ashoura

According to Jane's Defence Weekly, the Ashoura represents a major breakthrough in Iranian missile technology. It is the first two-stage MRBM using solid-fueled rocket motors instead of the existing liquid-fueled technology used on the Shahab. This would dramatically reduce the setup and deployment time for the missile and hence, shorten the amount of warning time for the enemy. Jane's noted that while the development parallels Pakistan's Shaheen-II MRBM there is no evidence to suggest there had been any prior technology exchange or with its other known technology partners such as North Korea or China.

Sejjil

An improved version, the Sejjil-2, was tested on 20 May 2009. Improvements include better navigation system, better targeting system, more payload, longer range, faster lift-off, longer storage time, quicker launch, and lower detection possibilities.

Simorgh
US Director of National Intelligence James Clapper told the Senate Armed Services Committee on 11 February 2014 that Iran was expected to test "a missile system that could potentially have ICBM-class range", a possible reference to the Simorgh satellite launch vehicle (SLV) on which Iran is working.

Emad

On October 10, 2015, Iran launched a new missile, the Emad. The Emad is capable of delivering a nuclear weapon and has a range of 1,700 km (c. 1,000 miles), enough to reach all of Israel and Saudi Arabia. It is considered to represent a great advance in accuracy, with a guidance and control system in its nose cone that functions during reentry into the atmosphere.

As a consequence of Iran's nuclear deal (JCPOA), on 20 July 2015 the United Nations Security Council Resolution 2231 was endorsed, replacing the Resolution 1929, which "called upon" Iran "not to undertake any activity related to ballistic missiles designed to be capable of delivering nuclear weapons". It has been argued that the language is not a legal prohibition. The U.S. ambassador to the UN Samantha Power said that the Emad missile was inherently capable of delivering a nuclear warhead which is therefore a violation. However, Vitaly Churkin, Russia's ambassador disputed this interpretation: "a call is different from a ban, so legally you cannot violate a call, you can comply with a call or you can ignore the call, but you cannot violate a call". Iran's foreign minister, Javad Zarif, responded by saying that since Iran does not possess nuclear weapons nor does it ever intends in having one, it does not design its missiles (Emad) to be capable of carrying something it does not have. Nevertheless, the testing of the Emad missile took place before the adoption of the Resolution 2231. The US, France, Britain, Germany, Sweden, Turkey, and Australia asked the UN Security Council to investigate and take appropriate action.

Khorramshahr

Hoveyzeh

The Hoveyzeh Cruise Missile is an all-weather, surface-to-surface cruise missile. The Hoveyzeh is from the Soumar family of cruise missiles. The missile was unveiled and put on display on February 2, 2019, at an exhibition of defense achievements in Tehran during commemorations of the 40th anniversary of the 1979 Iranian Revolution.

It has the ability to strike ground targets with high precision and accuracy. Its motor utilizes a turbojet, it releases low heat signatures and the missile is equipped to deal with the most sophisticated types of electronic warfare.

Discussing the capabilities of the missile, the Israeli military intelligence website DEBKAfile states that there is "no military force in the world has so far found an effective means of intercepting cruise missiles before they strike, unless they are short range." The missile is essentially immune to any sort of radar and missile defense systems.

Dezful

Raad-500

Haj Qasem

Missile Magazine System

Hypersonic ballistic missile 
On 10 November 2022, during the 11th anniversary of the death of Hassan Tehrani Moghaddam, known as the "father of Iranian missiles", Iran announced it has built an advanced hypersonic ballistic missile calling it a "major generational leap". Brigadier General Amir Ali Hajizadeh, IRGC-ASF commander, said the missile has a high velocity and can maneuver below and above the Earth's atmosphere. He said "it can breach all the systems of anti-missile defence" and added that he believed it would take decades before a system capable of intercepting it is developed. He also said not only it can breach the most advanced and significant missile defense systems (in the world), but it can also target them. The next day he stated that the tests have been made and that the missile will be unveiled in an appropriate time.

Anti-aircraft forces

Surface-to-air missiles
IRGC Aerospace Force is known to operate the following air defense equipment:
Medium-range 
Raad/3rd Khordad
Talash/15th Khordad
Point-defence 
Misagh-1 (QW-1 Vanguard)
Misagh-2 (QW-18)

Space Command

The IRGC Aerospace Force has been running its own space program, and on 22 April 2020, it made existence of its own 'Space Command' public. On that date it successfully launched its first military satellite, the Noor, into orbit. This was acknowledged by Western experts, and marked joining the club of about a dozen countries to have carried out such a project. The United States Space Force's chief of space operations, General John W. Raymond, said it was unlikely that Iran's Noor satellite provided any information of value, describing it as "a tumbling webcam in space." However, an Israeli security source told Haaretz that the satellite is "indeed an important accomplishment for the Iranian space program in general and its military in particular". Uzi Rubin commented that he "wouldn't be surprised" if an Iranian system of operational military space assets was soon operational.

On 29 July 2020, the Aerospace Force said that it had received detailed images of Al Udeid Air Base in Qatar, where United States Central Command's forward headquarters is hosted, captured by the satellite.

On 8 March 2022, a second launch of the Qased launch vehicle from the shahroud space center inserted into orbit the Noor-2 military reconnaissance satellite into orbit.

Commander of the Space Command, Brigadier General Ali Jafarabadi, has stated that the reconnaissance satellite is part of a larger project that will include satellites with communication and navigation capabilities, in addition to reconnaissance.

On 5 November 2022, the IRGC conducted a successful suborbital test launch of the newly unveiled Qaem-100 launch vehicle.

Personnel

Its personnel size is unknown according to the Congressional Research Service, while International Institute of Strategic Studies estimated that the military branch had 15,000 sworn members as of 2020.

Commanders

|-
| colspan="7" align="center"| Commander of the Aerospace Force of the Islamic Revolutionary Guard Corps

See also 

 List of air forces
 List of space forces

References

Islamic Revolutionary Guard Corps military branches
Iranian missile development program
1985 establishments in Iran
Army aviation of Iran
Air forces of Iran
Strategic forces
Space warfare
Military units and formations established in 1985